The Epcot International Food & Wine Festival is an annual food festival at Epcot, in the Walt Disney World Resort in Bay Lake, Florida. It would typically run from late September to mid-November, though in recent years the start date has moved earlier to mid-July. Special kiosks are set up around the World Showcase with food and drinks that reflect various countries. The activities, themes and corporate sponsors have changed over the years since the festival began in 1995.  

Admission to the basic festival is included with park admission, but guests must purchase the food and drink separately.  Activities have included concerts, books signings and demonstrations. Certain special events require a separate admission pass.

History

George Kalogridis, president of the Walt Disney World Resort since 2013, conceived the idea for the festival. The first Epcot International Food and Wine Festival was held in 1996. The thirty-day event ran from September 28 through October 27, and replaced a one weekend wine festival that was once held in previous years. The event featured food booths and stands, a gourmet food market, cooking demonstrations, seminars, wine sampling, and appearances by celebrity chefs.

On February 15, 2016, it was announced that Disney California Adventure would be hosting its own Food & Wine Festival, only on the weekends, during April 2016, after a five year hiatus.

2014

The Orlando Sentinel reported that the 2014 Epcot International Food & Wine Festival was to include 100,000 dessert portions, 360,000 beer servings, 300,000 wine pours, 1.5 million tapas-size food samplings and visitors from over 25 nations.

The event ran from September 19 to November 10, a total of 53 days, which was the longest in the festival's 19-year history.

The 2014 booths were Africa, Australia, Belgium, Block & Hans, Brazil, Brewer's Collection, Canada, China, Craft Beers, Desserts & Champagne, Farm Fresh, Fife & Drum, France, Germany, Greece, Hawai'i, Hops & Barley, Ireland, Italy, Japan, Mexico, Morocco, New Zealand, Patagonia, Poland, Puerto Rico, Refreshment Port, Scotland, Singapore, South Korea, Terra, and the Refreshment Cool Post.

2014 Eat to the Beat Concert Series

Eat to the Beat is a series of concerts during the festival at the America Gardens Theater. Performers performed three times during the day, at 5:30 pm, 6:45 pm, and 8:00 pm. The performers for the 2014 series were Jo Dee Messina, The Pointer Sisters, The Commodores, Christopher Cross, Hanson, Air Supply, Starship featuring Mickey Thomas, Sugar Ray, Fuel, Sister Hazel, Richard Marx, Billy Ocean, Night Ranger, Smash Mouth, Jim Brickman, Los Lonely Boys, Wilson Phillips, Dennis DeYoung (original member of STYX), 38 Special, Boyz II Men, David Cook, and Big Bad Voodoo Daddy.

2015
The 2015 Epcot International Food & Wine Festival ran from September 25 through November 16. The 2015 festival saw the additions of new booths including the Cheese Studio, the Wine Studio, Intermissions Café, The Outpost, Chew Lab, and Sustainable Chew, the latter two being inspired by the ABC show The Chew, as well a Dominican Republic booth. Also, the Ocean Spray Cranberry Bog returned for its fourth year after a one-year absence. Two countries did not return from the 2014 lineup, Puerto Rico and Singapore.

2015 Eat to the Beat Concert Series

The lineup included the return of Dennis DeYoung, Starship with Mickey Thomas, Christopher Cross, The Pointer Sisters, 38 Special, and Air Supply, alongside newcomers Tiffany, Maxi Priest, Everclear, and Chaka Khan.

2016
The 2016 Epcot International Food & Wine Festival ran from September 14 through November 14. The 2016 festival saw the additions of new booths including the Brewer's Collection, the Chocolate Studio and the Islands of the Caribbean. Not returning from the 2015 lineup included the booths of Fife & Drum, The Outpost, and Terra. The Wine Studio was combined with the Cheese Studio to become the Wine & Dine Studio, while The Chew Lab and Sustainable Chew combined to become The Chew Collective. The festival also included new premium events at some of the Disney resorts for the first time, including events at Disney's Contemporary Resort, Disney's Grand Floridian Resort & Spa, Disney's Polynesian Village Resort & Disney's Yacht Club Resort.

2016 Eat to the Beat Concert Series

The lineup includes the return of Dennis DeYoung, Starship with Mickey Thomas, Fuel, Sugar Ray, Los Lobos, Wilson Phillips, Blues Traveler, Christopher Cross, 38 Special, Chaka Khan, Billy Ocean, Hanson, Boyz II Men, Sister Hazel, Big Bad Voodoo Daddy, and Air Supply, alongside newcomers Wang Chung, BoDeans, Plain White T’s, Jeffrey Osborne, Toad The Wet Sprocket, Living Colour, Soul Asylum, & Delta Rae.

2017
The 2017 Epcot International Food & Wine Festival ran from August 31 through November 13.

2018
The 23rd Epcot International Food & Wine Festival was held from August 30 to November 12, 2018. There were numerous new additions to the festival in 2018 including a Character Dance Party, Sunday Brunch with the Chef, Junior Chef Kitchen and Food & Beverage Pairings. Returning special events such as celebrity chef demonstrations (From names such as Robert Irvine, Art Smith, Alex Guarnaschelli), Seminars for Cheese, Beverages, and Baking, Party for the Senses and 36 Food & Beverage Booths in the Marketplace throughout Epcot.

Festival Booth Listing: Active Eats, Africa, Almond Orchard (Hosted by Blue Diamond Almond Breeze), Australia, Belgium, Brazil, Brewer's Collection, Canada, The Cheese Studio (Hosted by Boursin Cheese, China, Chocolate Studio, Coastal Eats, Craft Drafts, Earth Eats, The Festival Center Wine Shop, Flavors from Fire, France, Germany, Greece, Hawai'i, Hops & Barley, India, Ireland, Islands of the Caribbean, Italy, Japan, Light Lab, Mexico, Morocco, New Zealand, Refreshment Outpost, Refreshment Port, Shimmering Sips Mimosa Bar, Spain, Thailand, Wine and Dine Studio.

2018 Eat to the Beat Concert Series
During the Festival, you can catch some of the most popular bands from the 80s to the 2000s performing nightly at the America Gardens Theater. Shows are at 5:30p, 6:45p and 8:00p nightly. These concerts are free with Epcot admission.

Featured Bands: Blue October, Tiffany, Mercy Me, Glass Tiger, Tauren Wells, Postmodern Jukebox, Vertical Horizon, Baha Men, Plain White T's, Living Color, Sheila E., Sugar Ray, David Cook, Jeffrey Osbourne, Jim Belushi with Sacred Hearts, Everclear, Mark Wills, Air Supply, Anderson East, Sister Hazel, 98 Degrees, .38 Special, Devon Allman Project, Kenny G, Billy Ocean, Starship with Mickey Thomas, Hanson, High Valley, Taylor Dayne, Boyz II Men, The Hooters, Big Bad Voodoo Daddy.

2019
The 24th Annual Epcot International Food & Wine Festival ran from August 29th to November 23rd for a record 87 days. Returning for this years festival is the wildly popular "Party for the Senses", Eat to the Beat Concerts, Demonstrations from Celebrity Chefs, a record number of food booths in the Global Marketplace, and all new seminars.

2019 Eat to the Beat Concert Series
During the Festival, you can catch some of the most popular bands from the 80s to the 2000s performing nightly at the America Gardens Theater. Shows are at 5:30p, 6:45p and 8:00p nightly. These concerts are free with Epcot admission.

Featured Bands: Everclear, 38 Special, Sheena Easton

2020
The 25th Annual Epcot International Food & Wine Festival ran from July 15. As part of Walt Disney World's modified operations, the 2020 festival will not feature the Eat to the Beat concert series.

See also
 Epcot International Flower & Garden Festival
 Disney California Adventure Food & Wine Festival

References

External links
 
 Allears.net - Epcot Food and Wine Festival Archive - information back to 1998

Epcot
Food and drink festivals in the United States
Festivals in Orlando, Florida
Wine festivals in the United States
1995 establishments in Florida
Festivals established in 1995